Šaltis or Saltis is a surname. Notable people with the surname include:

Joseph Saltis (1894-1947), Slovakian-American Prohibition gangster
Larry Saltis, a musician from New Monkees